Hilligoss is a surname. Notable people with the surname include:

Candace Hilligoss (born 1935), American actress
Nick Hilligoss, Australian animator